The women's 5000 metres at the 2015 Southeast Asian Games was held in National Stadium, Singapore. The track and field events took place on June 9.

Schedule
All times are (UTC+08:00)

Records

Results 
Legend
SB — Seasonal Best
PB — Personal Best

References

Athletics at the 2015 Southeast Asian Games
Women's sports competitions in Singapore
2015 in women's athletics